Pornanong Phatlum (born 4 December 1989) is a Thai professional golfer playing on the U.S.-based LPGA Tour.

Professional wins (21)

Ladies Asian Golf Tour wins (9)

^ Co-sanctioned by the Ladies European Tour.

Ladies European Tour wins (2)

^ Co-sanctioned by the Ladies Asian Golf Tour.

All Thailand Golf Tour wins (5)
2006 Singha Pattaya Open, Singha E-San Open
2011 Singha Masters, Singha Classic
2013 Singha Hua Hin Open

Thai LPGA Tour wins (5) 
 2012 (1) 6th Singha-SAT Thai LPGA Championship
 2013 (1) Thailand LPGA Masters
 2014 (1) Thailand LPGA Masters
 2015 (1) PTT Thailand LPGA Masters
 2016 (1) Bangchak Thai LPGA Open

Other wins (1)
2012 HSBC Brazil Cup (unofficial LPGA Tour event)

Results in LPGA majors
Results not in chronological order before 2019.

^ The Evian Championship was added as a major in 2013

CUT = missed the half-way cut
NT = no tournament
T = tied

Summary

Most consecutive cuts made – 5 (2018 British – 2019 PGA)
Longest streak of top-10s – 1 (twice)

LPGA Tour career summary 

official through the 2022 season

Futures Tour summary

Team appearances
Professional
International Crown (representing Thailand): 2014, 2016, 2018
Amata Friendship Cup (representing Thailand): 2018 (winners)

References

External links

Pornanong Phatlum
LPGA Tour golfers
Pornanong Phatlum
Golfers at the 2016 Summer Olympics
Pornanong Phatlum
Pornanong Phatlum
1989 births
Living people
Pornanong Phatlum